The 1997 Singer Akai Cup was held in Sharjah, UAE, between April 3-11, 1997. Three national teams took part: Pakistan, Sri Lanka, and Zimbabwe.

The 1997 Singer Akai Cup started with a double round-robin tournament where each team played the other twice. The two leading teams qualified for the final. Sri Lanka won the tournament and US$40,000. Runners-up Pakistan won US$25,000 and Zimbabwe US$10,000.

The beneficiaries of the tournament were Waqar Younis and Saeed Ahmed who each received US$35,000, and Aslam Khokhar, Israr Ali and Zulfiqar Ahmed (all Pakistan) who each received US$10,000.

Squads

Pakistan
Wasim Akram (captain)
Rameez Raja
Sajid Ali
Ijaz Ahmed
Shahid Afridi
Inzamam-ul-Haq
Saleem Malik
Mohammad Wasim
Mushtaq Ahmed
Moin Khan (wicket-keeper)
Saqlain Mushtaq
Waqar Younis
Mohammad Zahid
Shahid Nazir

Sri Lanka
Arjuna Ranatunga (captain)
Sanath Jayasuriya
Romesh Kaluwitharana (wicket-keeper)
Marvan Atapattu
Aravinda de Silva
Hashan Tillakaratne
Roshan Mahanama
Ruwan Kalpage
Kumar Dharmasena
Chaminda Vaas
Upul Chandana
Muttiah Muralitharan
Nuwan Zoysa
Sajeewa de Silva

Zimbabwe
Alistair Campbell (captain)
Andy Flower (vice-captain/wicket-keeper/coach)
Eddo Brandes
Stuart Carlisle
Grant Flower
Everton Matambanadzo
JA Rennie
Bryan Strang
Paul Strang
Heath Streak
Dirk Viljoen
Andy Whittall
Guy Whittall
Craig Wishart

Matches

Group stage

Final

See also
 Sharjah Cup

References

 Cricket Archive: Singer Akai Cup 1996/97
 ESPNCricinfo: Singer Akai Cup, 1996/97
 

International cricket competitions from 1994–95 to 1997
Singer Akai Cup, 1997
1997 in Emirati sport
International cricket competitions in the United Arab Emirates